The 2019 MTV Movie & TV Awards ceremony took place June 15, 2019 at the Barker Hangar in Santa Monica, California, with host Zachary Levi, and was broadcast two days later on June 17, 2019. It was the 28th edition of the awards and the third to jointly honor movies and television.

Performers
MTV announced Lizzo's performance on May 16, 2019, alongside a performance by Martin Garrix with Macklemore and Patrick Stump of Summer Days, but on June 10, it was announced that they would no longer perform and Bazzi would perform instead.
Lizzo – "Juice"
Bazzi – "Paradise"

Presenters
 Gal Gadot – presented Most Frightened Performance
 Zachary Levi – presented Generation Award
 Shameik Moore – presented Best Host
 Melissa McCarthy, Tiffany Haddish, and Elisabeth Moss – introduced Lizzo performance
 B. Simone – presented Most Meme-able Moment (red carpet)
 Nick Kroll and Trixie Mattel – presented Reality Royalty
 Kumail Nanjiani and Dave Bautista – presented Best Fight
 Tiffany Haddish – presented Trailblazer Award
 Daniel Levy and Annie Murphy – presented Best Performance in a Movie
 Kiernan Shipka, Ross Lynch, and Gavin Leatherwood – presented Best Kiss
 Anna Graves – announced Best Hero (commercial reveal)
 Jameela Jamil and MJ Rodriguez – presented Best Documentary
 Josh Horowitz – presented Best Show (red carpet)
 Cast of Euphoria – introduced Bazzi performance(Storm Reid, Maude Apatow, Algee Smith, Sydney Sweeney, Alexa Demie, Hunter Schafer, and Barbie Ferreira) 
 Haley Lu Richardson – presented Best Performance in a Show
 Finn Wolfhard, Gaten Matarazzo, and Noah Schnapp – presented Best Breakthrough Performance
 Aubrey Plaza and David Spade – presented Best Comedic Performance
 Tessa Thompson – presented Best Movie

Winners and nominees
The full list of nominees was announced on May 14, 2019. Winners are listed first, in bold.

Note: † Jason Mitchell's nomination was rescinded on May 29, 2019 due to personal conduct issues.

MTV Generation Award
Dwayne "The Rock" Johnson

MTV Trailblazer Award
Jada Pinkett Smith

Multiple nominations

Film 
The following movies received multiple nominations:
Four – Avengers: Endgame, RBG
Three – Captain Marvel, To All the Boys I've Loved Before, Us
Two – Bird Box, BlacKkKlansman, Bohemian Rhapsody, Crazy Rich Asians, Shazam!, Spider-Man: Into the Spider-Verse, A Star Is Born

Television 
The following television series received multiple nominations:
Four – Game of Thrones
Three – Riverdale
Two – The Bachelor, Big Mouth, Chilling Adventures of Sabrina, The Handmaid's Tale, The Haunting of Hill House, RuPaul's Drag Race,  Schitt's Creek, Sex Education

References

External links 
 MTV Movie & TV Awards official site

MTV Movie & TV Awards
MTV Movie Awards
2019 in Los Angeles
2019 in American cinema
MTV Movie